Arene hindsiana is a species of sea snail, a marine gastropod mollusk in the family Areneidae.

Description

The shell can grow to be 3 mm to 5.3 mm in length.

Distribution

References

External links
 To Biodiversity Heritage Library (1 publication)
 To World Register of Marine Species

Areneidae
Gastropods described in 1932